The Keystone Derby Cup is the name of a competition held between Penn FC (formerly, the Harrisburg City Islanders) and Pittsburgh Riverhounds SC of United Soccer League (USL), the second division of soccer in the United States.

The Keystone Derby Cup is awarded to the club with the best head-to-head record in Pennsylvania at the end of the USL season. The competition is currently sponsored by the Pennsylvania Lottery but does not include the third Pennsylvania-based USL club, Bethlehem Steel FC. In case of a tie record, the winner of the Derby will be determined by goal differential between the two teams.

History
Although they had been rivals and competed against each other in previous seasons, the inaugural Keystone Derby was officially contested between the Riverhounds and the Harrisburg City Islanders in 2015. Pittsburgh went on to win the cup in the first edition of the tournament with a head-to-head record of three wins and one loss.

All-time game results

Top goalscorers

Bold indicates player is an active roster member.

References

USL Championship
Soccer in Pennsylvania
Pittsburgh Riverhounds SC
Penn FC
Soccer rivalries in the United States
Soccer cup competitions in the United States
2015 establishments in Pennsylvania
Sports in Pittsburgh
Sports in Harrisburg, Pennsylvania